Boyd House may refer to:

Adam Boyd House, Center Point, AR, listed on the NRHP in Arkansas
Thomas Sloan Boyd House, Lonoke, AR, listed on the NRHP in Arkansas
Boyd House (San Rafael, California), listed on the NRHP in California
Byron and Ivan Boyd House, Des Moines, IA, listed on the NRHP in Iowa
Saunders-Boyd House, Hodgenville, KY, listed on the NRHP in Kentucky
Bird/Boyd Farm House, Byron, MI, listed on the NRHP in Michigan
Woolverton-Boyd House, Enterprise, MS, listed on the NRHP in Mississippi
Boyd-Cothern House, Jayess, MS, listed on the NRHP in Mississippi
Ackerman-Boyd House, Franklin Lakes, NJ, NRHP-listed
James Boyd House, Southern Pines, NC, listed on the NRHP in North Carolina
Boyd House (University of Oklahoma), listed on the NRHP as "President's House, University of Oklahoma"
Charles Boyd Homestead Group, Bend, OR, NRHP-listed
Boschke-Boyd House, Portland, OR, NRHP-listed
Boyd-Hall House, Abilene, TX, listed on the NRHP in Texas
Boyd-Wilson Farm, Franklin, TN, NRHP-listed
William Boyd House, Franklin, TN, NRHP-listed
Boyd-Harvey House, Knoxville, TN, NRHP-listed
Theron Boyd Homestead, Hartford, VT, listed on the NRHP in Vermont